Colin Briggs is a current professional lacrosse player for the Boston Cannons of the MLL. He was an All-ACC midfielder for the University of Virginia Cavaliers and was named the Most Outstanding Player of the 2011 NCAA Tournament. He was originally drafted 6th overall in the 2012 MLL Collegiate Draft by the Denver Outlaws.

References 

Major League Lacrosse players
1989 births
University of Virginia alumni
People from Narragansett, Rhode Island
Living people
Sportspeople from Washington County, Rhode Island